The fourth and final season of the American crime drama television series The Killing consists of six episodes and was released on Netflix on August 1, 2014. Netflix picked up the series after it was canceled by AMC in 2013.

Plot 
The season features detectives Sarah Linden and Stephen Holder handling the fallout of their actions from the previous season while investigating the murder of a family whose only survivor is a member of an all-boys military academy.

Cast

Main cast 
 Mireille Enos as Sarah Linden
 Joel Kinnaman as Stephen Holder
 Gregg Henry as Carl Reddick
 Tyler Ross as Kyle Stansbury, a member of the all-boys military academy and survivor of a family massacre
 Sterling Beaumon as Lincoln Knopf
 Levi Meaden as AJ Fielding
 Liam James as Jack Linden, Sarah's son
 Amy Seimetz as Danette Leeds
 Billy Campbell as Darren Richmond

Special guest star 
 Joan Allen as Colonel Margaret Rayne, headmaster of the all-boys military academy

Guest stars 
 Jewel Staite as Caroline Swift, Holder's girlfriend and a District Attorney
 Katherine Evans as Bethany Skinner, James Skinner's daughter
 Frances Fisher as Gena Geddes, Sarah's mother
 Annie Corley as Regi Darnell, Sarah's social worker and mother figure
 Marin Ireland as Liz Holder, Stephen's sister
 Patti Smith as Dr. Ann Morrison, neurosurgeon / doctor at North Central Hospital

Episodes

Development and production 
AMC, the network which broadcast the first three seasons, canceled the series after its second season, and revived it for a third, ultimately cancelling it again after the third season in September 2013. However, in November 2013, Netflix, partnering with Fox Television Studios (the production company for The Killing), announced it had picked up the series for a fourth and final season consisting of six episodes. Series developer and executive producer Veena Sud returned as showrunner, with Dawn Prestwich and Nicole Yorkin returning as writers and executive producers. Because they are airing on Netflix, episodes in the fourth season have a longer running time of approximately 55–59 minutes compared to 43 minutes when the series aired on AMC with commercials, and characters are able to use stronger profanity.

Casting 
Cast members Mireille Enos and Joel Kinnaman return as detectives Sarah Linden and Stephen Holder, respectively. New series regulars for the fourth season include Joan Allen as Margaret Rayne, the head of an all-boys military academy. In February 2014, Sterling Beaumon, Levi Meaden, and Tyler Ross were cast as Lincoln Knopf, AJ Fielding, and Cameron Stanton (later changed to Kyle Stansbury), respectively; playing teens connected to the military academy. Gregg Henry, who had a recurring role in the third season as Detective Carl Reddick, was promoted to series regular for the fourth season. The season also introduces Sarah Linden's mother, played by Frances Fisher, who abandoned her daughter when Sarah was young. Having written to Veena Sud at the end of season three praising her for a well-written and superbly acted show, artist Patti Smith was invited to come and watch the filming for the beginning of season four, and when she arrived was offered a cameo role as neurologist Ann Morrison in the first episode.

Promotional video
In July 2014, an official 90-second trailer was released showing detectives Linden and Holder attempting to cover up Linden's killing Skinner at the end of the previous season as well as glimpses of a new case at the military academy.

Critical reception
The fourth season scored 53 out of 100 on Metacritic based on 14 critics, indicating "mixed or average reviews". The review aggregator website Rotten Tomatoes reported a 44% critics rating with an average rating of 6.5/10 based on 18 reviews. The website consensus reads: "While its characters still intrigue and its atmosphere remains absorbingly dark, The Killing succumbs to silliness in its fourth season, straying into distractingly overwrought territory".

Home media releases 
The fourth season of The Killing was released on DVD on August 4, 2015, exclusively through Amazon's CreateSpace manufacture-on-demand program.

References

External links 
  on Netflix
 

The Killing (American TV series)
2014 American television seasons